The 2014 Yarkant attacks occurred in Yarkant County in Xinjiang on 28 July. Authorities stated that an armed gang of masked militants carried out attacks against civilians as well as local police across towns in the county.

Background
The year of 2014 saw an increase in the intensity of Xinjiang-linked violence, attributed to Uighur separatist activity in the region. The attacks took place towards the end of the month of Ramadan. Authorities stated the gang members had gatherings during this month during which they planned out and prepared the attack. Locals linked the attacks to government restrictions and crackdowns on Ramadan as well as the alleged extrajudicial killing of a Uighur family.

Attack
Authorities stated that armed militants carried out acts of violence in the towns of Elixku and Huangdi. The militants attacked a police station and government offices in Elixku, before moving on to Huangdi, targeting civilians and smashing vehicles. They also reportedly set up roadblocks to stop vehicles and attack passengers, and according to locals, attempted to coerce civilians into joining the attack.

 During the attacks, some 30 police cars were reported damaged or destroyed. Police shot dead 59 attackers and arrested 215 suspects. Banners calling for jihad, as well as weapons including long knives and axes were confiscated.

Aftermath
Dilxat Raxit, a representative of the exiled World Uyghur Congress, spoke out against the Chinese government's policies in Xinjiang, stating, "If Beijing does not change its policy of extreme repression, this could lead to even more clashes". Authorities named Nuramat Sawut as the ringleader of the attacks, accusing him of having close links to the militant East Turkestan Islamic Movement. In a statement following the attacks, Xinjiang's top official Zhang Chunxian said there would be no let-up in the government fight against militants.

References

Terrorist incidents in China in 2014
21st century in Xinjiang
People shot dead by law enforcement officers in China
Xinjiang conflict
2014 murders in China
East Turkestan independence movement
Islamic terrorist incidents in 2014